LHT Tower or Luk Hoi Tong Building is an office building and shopping mall at 31 Queen's Road Central, Central, Hong Kong. It is directly adjacent to MTR Central station. It was opened in November 2011.

History
LHT Tower was constructed at the former site of the Queen's Theatre. It is owned by The Luk Hoi Tong Company Limited. In 2008, the old building was demolished to be redeveloped.

Architect and construction
It is designed by Rocco Design Architects Limited, Gammon Construction Limited was awarded the contract for the redevelopment. The property is managed by Jones Lang LaSalle.

Building
Luk Hoi Tong Building comprises a 28-storey mixed office and retail tower with a gross floor area of 21,000 square metres, spreading over 21 floors of office, two levels of mechanical floor, a three-level podium retails, a basement floor and two dining floors. The site was originally occupied by the old Queen's Theatre in 1925 and was later developed into an office cum cinema building in 1961.

Tenants
Gap occupies 15,000 square feet of office space in the redeveloped LHT Tower on Queen's Road Central in November, with Swatch taking a smaller store in the same building.

References

External links

Official website

Office buildings in Hong Kong
Shopping centres in Hong Kong
Central, Hong Kong
Office buildings completed in 2011